WHUT may refer to:

WHUT-TV, a Washington, D.C. TV station owned and operated by Howard University.
Wuhan University of Technology, in the People's Republic of China